Centennial GO Station is a train station on the GO Transit Stouffville line in Markham, Ontario, Canada.  The station is located directly west of McCowan Road and north of Bullock Drive, near the Markham Centennial Park.

Services
Centennial Station does not have a bus terminal.  Connecting bus services serve on-street stops adjacent to the station at Bullock Drive and McCowan Road.

GO Transit
 On weekdays, Stouffville line train service to Centennial Station consists of 9 trains southbound to Union Station in the morning and 9 trains northbound to Lincolnville in the afternoon or late evening.  Service at other times and in other directions is provided by GO bus route 71, which also continues beyond Lincolnville to Uxbridge station.
 Route 54, a GO Transit bus, serves this station. This bus operates between Mount Joy Station and the bus terminal at Highway 407 station via Highway 407.

Toronto Transit Commission

129A McCowan North serves the station. There are northbound buses to Major Mackenzie Drive and southbound buses to Scarborough Centre station. 
This route is operated by the TTC on behalf of York Region Transit. An extra TTC fare is required when crossing Steeles Avenue into Toronto. Despite this being a TTC bus, a YRT fare is charged while the bus is north of Steeles Avenue.

York Region Transit
 40 Unionville Local (rush hour only)
 41 Markham Local (rush hour only)
 42 Berczy (rush hour only)
 45 Mingay (rush hour only)
 301 Markham Express (rush hour only)
 304 Mount Joy Express (rush hour only)

References

External links

GO Transit railway stations
Railway stations in Markham, Ontario
Year of establishment missing
Railway stations in Canada opened in 2004
2004 establishments in Ontario